The 2003 Alamo Bowl was an American football bowl game between the Michigan State Spartans and the Nebraska Cornhuskers played December 29, 2003 at the Alamodome in San Antonio, Texas.

In a defensive game, Nebraska scored first, leading 3–0 on a 29-yard field goal kicked by David Dyches. Michigan State's Dave Rayner tied the score at 3 at the end of the 1st quarter, kicking a 46-yard field goal. In the second quarter, running back Cory Ross scored on touchdown runs of 2 and 6 yards, to give Nebraska a 17–3 lead.

There was no further scoring, and the game ended with Nebraska defeating Michigan State, 17–3.

Statistics

References

External links
 Review of game by USA Today
 Review of game by Huskers.com

Alamo Bowl
Alamo Bowl
Michigan State Spartans football bowl games
Nebraska Cornhuskers football bowl games